| top_scorer     =  Deon McCaulay
| prevseason     = 2010
| nextseason     = 2018
}}
The CONCACAF qualification for the 2014 FIFA World Cup consisted of four rounds of competition, in which the 35 member nations competed for three automatic berths at the finals in Brazil.

The United States, Costa Rica, and Honduras qualified. The fourth-place finisher, Mexico, played a two-game series against New Zealand, the first-placed team from Oceania and qualified to the Finals.

Format
In March 2011, following news that CONCACAF would not receive four spots in the 2014 World Cup, officials within CONCACAF indicated that the first format proposed would be revised. Several days later, officials within CONCACAF announced the qualifying format they would present to FIFA. The proposed format, which was subsequently accepted by FIFA, consists of 4 stages.
Round One. Teams ranked 26–35 will play-off to reduce the number of entrants to 30.
Round Two.  6 groups of 4 teams. This round includes the 5 qualifiers from the preliminary round plus teams ranked 7–25. The top team in each group advances to the next stage.
Round Three (Semifinal round). 3 groups of 4. Teams ranked 1–6 face off against the 6 group winners from the previous round. The top two in each group advance.
Round Four (Hexagonal). The top two teams in each group from the semifinal round compete in one group of 6. The top three teams advance to the World Cup finals, while the 4th place team advances to an intercontinental play-off.

Entrants
All 35 FIFA-affiliated national teams from CONCACAF entered qualification. The seeding – used to draw the first three rounds of the qualifiers – was based on the FIFA World Rankings of March 2011. (World rankings shown in parentheses)

Schedule
The schedule of the competition was as follows.

The inter-confederation play-off between the fourth-placed team from CONCACAF (Mexico) and the winning team from OFC (New Zealand) was played between 13 and 20 November 2013.

First round

The first round of the CONCACAF qualifiers saw the bottom 10 teams being paired up into five home-and-away series, with the highest ranked team facing the lowest ranked team and so on. The winners of these series proceeded to the second round.

The matchups were announced by FIFA on 26 April 2011. Early indications were that the matches would be played on 3 and 7 June 2011; However, the matches were postponed to scattered days in June and July, between 15 June and 17 July. The 5 winners (in bold, below) advanced to the second round of the CONCACAF qualifiers: Belize, Dominican Republic, U.S. Virgin Islands, Saint Lucia, and the Bahamas.

The two wins for the U.S. Virgin Islands were their first two ever in World Cup play, with their only other win prior to this coming in 1998.

|}
Note 1: Order of legs reversed from originally published draw.

Second round

In the second round, the teams ranked 7–25 were joined by the 5 winners from the first round. These teams were drawn into six groups of four teams, at the World Cup Preliminary Draw at the Marina da Glória in Rio de Janeiro, Brazil on 30 July 2011. The matches were played from 2 September to 15 November 2011.

The top team from each group advanced to the third round.

Seeding
Teams were seeded into four pots – designated Pots 4 to 7 in the draw. Pot 4 included teams ranked 7–12, Pot 5 teams ranked 13–18, Pot 6 teams ranked 19–24, and Pot 7 the team ranked 25 along with the 5 first round winners.

† First round winners

Groups
Note: Scores marked by * are results awarded by FIFA.

Group A

Group B

Group C

 withdrew from the tournament on 19 August 2011 and were not replaced.

Group D

Group E

Group F

Third round

The third round saw the top 6 seeds joined by the 6 group winners from the second round.  These teams were drawn into three groups of four teams, at the World Cup Preliminary Draw at the Marina da Glória in Rio de Janeiro, Brazil on 30 July 2011. These matches were played from 8 June to 16 October 2012.

The top two teams from each group advanced to the fourth round.

Seeding
As the draw for the third round was held before the previous matches were held, only the six teams with byes to the round were known at the time of the draw.  Teams were seeded into three pots, with Pot 1 containing the top 3 seeds, Pot 2 seeds 4 to 6, and Pot 3 the 6 group winners from the second round.  Each third round group contains one team from Pot 1, one team from Pot 2 and two teams from Pot 3.

† Second round winners whose identity was not known at the time of the draw

Groups

Group A

Group B

Group C

Fourth round

In the fourth round, the three group winners and three runners-up from the third round competed in a double round robin, including a home and away match against the other five teams between 6 February and 15 October 2013. The round is informally referred to as the 'Hexagonal' or just 'The Hex'. The draw for 'The Hex' was conducted by FIFA on 7 November 2012.

The top three teams qualified directly for the 2014 FIFA World Cup finals, while the fourth-placed team, Mexico, played a home-away series against New Zealand, the winner of Oceania qualifying. Teams are ranked first by total points in all games, then, if tied, by best goal differential in all games, then by total goals in all games. If still tied, the same criteria are applied to games among the tied teams.

Inter-confederation play-offs

The winner of the OFC qualification tournament, New Zealand, played against CONCACAF's fourth-placed team, Mexico, in a home-and-away play-off. Mexico, the winner of this play-off, qualified for the 2014 FIFA World Cup.

The first leg was played on 13 November 2013 in Mexico City, and the second leg was played on 20 November 2013 in Wellington.

Qualified teams
The following four teams from CONCACAF qualified for the final tournament.

1 Bold indicates champions for that year. Italic indicates hosts for that year.

Goalscorers
There were 444 goals scored over 144 games (including inter-confederation play-offs), for an average of 3.08 goals per game.

11 goals

 Deon McCaulay

10 goals

 Peter Byers
 Oribe Peralta
 Blas Pérez

9 goals

 Jerry Bengtson

8 goals

 Álvaro Saborío
 Clint Dempsey

7 goals

 Carlo Costly
 Luis Tejada

6 goals

 Tamarley Thomas
 Rocky Siberie
 Carlos Ruiz
 Osael Romero

5 goals

 Lesly St. Fleur
 Erick Ozuna
 Jean-Eudes Maurice
 Javier Hernández

4 goals

 Randolph Burton
 Iain Hume
 Simeon Jackson
 Olivier Occean
 Kervens Belfort
 Héctor Ramos
 Lester Peltier
 Jozy Altidore
 Eddie Johnson

3 goals

 Khano Smith
 Dwayne De Rosario
 Tosaint Ricketts
 Josh Simpson
 Celso Borges
 Joel Campbell
 Randall Brenes
 Bryan Ruiz
 Jonathan Faña
 Inoel Navarro
 Léster Blanco
 Rafael Burgos
 Freddy García
 Dwight Pezzarossi
 Mario Rodríguez
 Jaylee Hodgson
 Ian Lake
 Jamil Joseph
 Cliff Valcin
 Kenwyne Jones

2 goals

 Quinton Griffith
 Frederick Gomez
 Nesley Jean
 Harrison Róches
 Nahki Wells
 Will Johnson
 Mark Ebanks
 Sendley Bito
 Shanon Carmelia
 Domingo Peralta
 Jaime Alas
 Luis Anaya
 Christian Bautista
 Isidro Gutiérrez
 Rodolfo Zelaya
 Clive Murray
 Shane Rennie
 Minor López
 Marco Pappa
 Trayon Bobb
 Vurlon Mills
 Chris Nurse
 Ricky Shakes
 Jean Alexandre
 James Marcelin
 Mario Martínez
 Demar Phillips
 Dane Richards
 Luton Shelton
 Rodolph Austin
 Carlos Salcido
 Jesús Zavala
 Raúl Jiménez
 Raúl Leguías
 Nelson Barahona
 Rolando Blackburn
 Ricardo Buitrago
 Amir Waithe
 Luis Henríquez
 Gabriel Torres
 Andrés Cabrero
 Myron Samuel
 Cornelius Stewart
 Friso Mando
 Carlos Bocanegra
 Graham Zusi
 Herculez Gomez
 Reid Klopp

1 goal

 Dexter Blackstock
 Ranjae Christian
 Justin Cochrane
 George Dublin
 Marc Joseph
 Keiran Murtagh
 Kerry Skepple
 Jamie Thomas
 David Abdul
 Rensy Barradas
 Maurice Escalona
 Erik Santos de Gouveia
 Cameron Hepple
 Jackner Louis
 Diquan Adamson
 Sheridan Grosvenor
 Daniel Jiménez
 Elroy Kuylen
 Luis Mendez
 Ryan Simpson
 John Nusum
 Antwan Russell
 Kwame Steede
 Trevor Peters
 David Edgar
 Christian Bolaños
 José Miguel Cubero
 Cristian Gamboa
 Roy Miller
 Michael Umaña
 Diego Calvo
 Jhonny Acosta
 Alberto Gómez
 Angelo Cijntje
 Orin de Waard
 Everon Espacia
 Rihairo Meulens
 Angelo Zimmerman
 Johan Cruz
 César García
 Jack Michael Morillo
 Kerbi Rodríguez
 Jhoan Sánchez
 Xavier García
 Alfredo Pacheco
 Steve Purdy
 Edwin Sánchez
 Herbert Sosa
 Victor Turcios
 Lancaster Joseph
 Marcus Julien
 Cassim Langaigne
 Gustavo Cabrera
 Carlos Figueroa
 Yony Flores
 Carlos Gallardo
 Angelo Padilla
 Guillermo Ramírez
 Fredy Thompson
 Anthony Abrams
 Shawn Beveney
 Leon Cort
 Charles Pollard
 Gregory Richardson
 Judelin Aveska
 Réginal Goreux
 Wilde-Donald Guerrier
 Kim Jaggy
 Kevin Lafrance
 Jean Monuma
 Listner Pierre-Louis
 Víctor Bernárdez
 Juan Carlos Garcia
 Marvin Chávez
 Roger Rojas
 Oscar García
 Wilson Palacios
 Maynor Figueroa
 Ryan Johnson
 Nyron Nosworthy
 Jermaine Beckford
 Marvin Elliott
 Jermaine Anderson
 Giovani dos Santos
 Andrés Guardado
 Héctor Moreno
 Ángel Reyna
 Aldo de Nigris
 Paul Aguilar
 Rafael Márquez
 Carlos Alberto Peña
 Daniel Reyes
 Félix Rodríguez
 Roberto Chen
 Román Torres
 Cristian Arrieta
 Joseph Marrero
 Devaughn Elliott
 Jevon Francis
 Orlando Mitchum
 Kevin Edward
 Kurt Frederick
 Tremain Paul
 Zaine Pierre
 Giovanni Drenthe
 Evani Esperance
 Naldo Kwasie
 Keon Daniel
 Hughton Hector
 Kevin Molino
 Darryl Roberts
 Aron Jóhannsson
 Brad Evans
 Landon Donovan
 Michael Orozco Fiscal
 Jamie Browne
 Keithroy Cornelius
 Alderman Lesmond
 Dwayne Thomas

1 own goal

 Angelo Zimmerman (playing against Haiti)
 Lyndon Joseph (playing against Guatemala)
 Nicko Williams (playing against Guatemala)
 Charles Pollard (playing against Mexico)
 J. P. Rodrigues (playing against Mexico)
 Jorge Claros (playing against Jamaica)
 Héctor Moreno (playing against Guyana)
 Román Torres (playing against Nicaragua)
 Woody Gibson (playing against Bahamas)

References

External links
Results and schedule (FIFA.com version)
Results and schedule (CONCACAF.com version)

 
Concacaf
FIFA World Cup qualification (CONCACAF)